Dmitri Poline is a paralympic swimmer from Russia competing mainly in category SB9 events.

Dmitri competed in one event in the 2004 Summer Paralympics in Athens, he won the gold medal in the 100m breaststroke in a world record time of 1:11.13

References

External links
 

Paralympic swimmers of Russia
Swimmers at the 2004 Summer Paralympics
Paralympic gold medalists for Russia
Russian male breaststroke swimmers
Living people
Medalists at the 2004 Summer Paralympics
Year of birth missing (living people)
Paralympic medalists in swimming
S9-classified Paralympic swimmers
20th-century Russian people
21st-century Russian people